Washtenaw County is a county located in the U.S. state of Michigan. At the 2020 census, the population was 372,258. The county seat is Ann Arbor. The county was authorized by legislation in 1822 and organized as a county in 1826.
Washtenaw County comprises the Ann Arbor Metropolitan Statistical Area.
The county is home to the University of Michigan, Eastern Michigan University, Washtenaw Community College, and Concordia University Ann Arbor.

History

First Nations' Territories
The first peoples occupying the central portion of what is now Michigan included: "the Pottawattamies, the Chippewas, the Ottawas, the Wyandottes and the Hurons". First nations whose territories included land within the Washtenaw County boundaries are shown to have included: Myaamia (Miami), Bodéwadmiké (Potawatomi), Anishinabewaki ᐊᓂᔑᓈᐯᐗᑭ, Peoria, Meškwahki·aša·hina (Fox), and the Mississauga nation.

Etymology of Washtenaw
In the Ojibwe language, "Wash-ten-ong" or "Owashtanong" literally translates as "far away waters", and was then used by the Ojibwe as the name for the Grand River due to its great length.
At the time of the official naming of the county in 1822, the headwaters of the Grand River fell within the original boundaries of Washtenaw County, which encompassed a much larger area than the present county.

Early colonization
The earliest histories mention French trappers and traders conducting trade in the area at the Potawatomi Trail and Pontiac Trail crossings of the Huron River, and later English then American settlers. The first successful settlement was established at the present site of Ypsilanti about 1809 by French traders.

In 1822, the Legislative Council of Michigan Territory government defined the name and boundaries of the county, but attached it to Wayne County for revenue, taxation and judicial affairs. Four years after the first platting out of the county, Washtenaw was established as a separate self-administered county by an act of the Michigan Territorial Legislature, in 1826. It was attached for administrative purposes to Wayne County until {before 1829} when county government was seated. Ingham and other counties were formed from portions of territorial Washtenaw County.

Swamps were drained and farms were tiled to lower the water table. The swamp northwest of the I-94 and US-23 intersection, and areas within Waterloo Recreation Area still appear as they did to early settlers. As productive farms became established, the local deer herds grew. In the 1820s and 1830s, the events surrounding the independence of Greece from Turkey inspired construction of Greek Revival buildings, and the names of townships, towns, and children.

The "frostbitten constitutional convention" was held at Ann Arbor, the county seat, in 1835. Statehood was delayed because Michigan claimed the Toledo Strip, which was also claimed by Ohio. Following resolution of the Toledo War (1835–1836), in which Michigan Territory ceded its claim to Toledo in exchange for most of the Upper Peninsula (from the Porcupine Mountains eastward), Ohio withdrew its objection and Michigan became a state on January 26, 1837.

The constitutional convention also decided to move the capital from Detroit to a point further away from the Canadian border.  After considering many existing communities, the delegates decided to build an entirely new capital city, which became Lansing.  The University of Michigan, founded at Detroit in 1817, was moved to Ann Arbor in 1839 as a consolation for the city not being named the new state capital, as it had sought.  The University subsequently became and remains Washtenaw County's largest employer.

In 1849, the Michigan State Normal School (now Eastern Michigan University) was established in Washtenaw's oldest settlement, Ypsilanti.  It was elevated to collegiate status c. 1891 as Michigan State Normal College.  The name was changed in 1956 to Eastern Michigan College, which was elevated to university status in 1959.

Geography

Adjacent counties

 Livingston County (north)
 Oakland County (northeast)
 Wayne County (east)
 Monroe County (southeast)
 Lenawee County (southwest)
 Jackson County (west)
 Ingham County (northwest)

Major highways

Demographics

As of the 2010 United States census, there were 344,791 people living in the county. 74.5% were White, 12.7% Black or African American, 7.9% Asian, 0.3% Native American, 1.2% of some other race and 3.4% of two or more races. 4.0% were Hispanic or Latino (of any race). 16.0% were of German, 7.6% English, 7.5% Irish, 6.3% American and 5.0% Polish ancestry.

Washtenaw has the highest proportion of Asian-American residents of any Michigan county.

As of the 2000 census of 2000, 17.4% of county residents were of German ancestry; 9.0% cited English, 8.4% Irish, 5.3% Polish and 5.0% American ancestry. According to Census 2000, 87.1% spoke only English at home; 2.7% spoke Spanish and 1.7% Chinese or Mandarin.

There were 125,327 households, out of which 29.20% had children under the age of 18 living with them, 46.40% were married couples living together, 9.30% had a female householder with no husband present, and 41.20% were non-families. 29.50% of all households were made up of individuals, and 5.90% had someone living alone who was 65 years of age or older. The average household size was 2.41 and the average family size was 3.02.

In the county, 22.10% of the population was under the age of 18, 17.10% was from 18 to 24, 32.10% from 25 to 44, 20.60% from 45 to 64, and 8.10% were 65 years of age or older. The median age was 31 years. For every 100 females, there were 98.90 males. For every 100 females age 18 and over, there were 97.10 males.

The median income for a household in the county was $51,990, and the median income for a family was $70,393 (these figures had risen to $59,887 and $80,779 respectively as of a 2007 estimate.) Males had a median income of $49,304 versus $33,598 for females. The per capita income for the county was $27,173. About 5.10% of families and 11.10% of the population were below the poverty line, including 8.60% of those under age 18 and 5.80% of those age 65 or over.

Government

Elected officials
 Prosecuting Attorney: Eli Savit (Democrat)
 Sheriff: Jerry Clayton (Democrat)
 County Clerk/Register of Deeds: Lawrence Kestenbaum (Democrat)
 County Treasurer: Catherine McClary (Democrat)
 Water Resources Commissioner: Evan Pratt (Democrat)

The Board of Commissioners has nine members, elected from single member districts, on a partisan ballot, in November of even-numbered years. The term is two years. Information as of May 2017.

Government services

Parks and recreation

Washtenaw county operates 10 parks and one recreation center (gymnasium). One park has a water sprinkler area, one has a substantial water park component, and there is one golf course. The recreation center has a swimming pool, indoor track, basketball courts, complete set of resistance machines, a weight room, and several multipurpose rooms.

Washtenaw county is in the process of acquiring land for natural preservation. The program started in 2001, was renewed in 2010. The millage was renewed a second time in 2020 with a record high of 72% of votes supporting the renewal. Eight parcels of land had been purchased by July 2007. These parcels are of special ecological, recreational, and educational benefits. They are preserved in a natural unimproved state and are open to the public during daylight hours.

Wireless communication
In partnership with private enterprise, the county maintains a wireless network which is currently available to approximately 50% of county residents. This is the Wireless Washtenaw Project; its stated aim of this project is to provide wireless access to all county residents.

Miscellaneous
The county government operates the jail, maintains rural roads (through a largely independent road commission), operates the major local courts, records deeds and mortgages, maintains vital records, administers public health regulations, and participates with the state in providing welfare and social services. The county board of commissioners controls the budget and has limited authority to make laws or ordinances. In Michigan, most local government functions – police and fire, building and zoning, tax assessment, street maintenance, etc. – are the responsibility of individual cities and townships.

Politics

Since 1988, when Michael Dukakis won it, the county has been a Democratic stronghold in local and national elections due to the presence of Ann Arbor and the University of Michigan. In the 2020 United States presidential election it gave 72.4% of the vote to Democratic nominee Joe Biden, the highest margin for a Democrat in the county, the third-highest for any candidate in the county's history, and the highest in the state at the time as well. Between 1960 and 1988 it was generally a swing county: 1992 was the first time it voted for the same party as it did in the last election since 1960. Despite its modern-day Democratic strength, it was reliably Republican at the presidential level from 1896 to 1960, only voting Democratic once in that span in 1912 when the Republican vote was split. George McGovern's win over Richard Nixon in the county in 1972 despite the latter winning nationally by a landslide was a sign of the county's shift towards supporting the Democratic Party, though Michigander Gerald R. Ford won it in 1976 & Ronald Reagan won it in 1984 among his national landslide, being the most recent Republican to win the county.

Economy

The largest employers in Washtenaw County, as of July 2018, are:

Communities

Cities
 Ann Arbor (county seat)
 Chelsea
 Dexter
 Milan (partial)
 Saline
 Ypsilanti

Villages
 Barton Hills
 Manchester

Charter townships
 Ann Arbor Charter Township
 Augusta Charter Township
 Pittsfield Charter Township
 Superior Charter Township
 York Charter Township
 Ypsilanti Charter Township

Civil townships

 Bridgewater Township
 Dexter Township
 Freedom Township
 Lima Township
 Lodi Township
 Lyndon Township
 Manchester Township
 Northfield Township
 Salem Township
 Saline Township
 Scio Township
 Sharon Township
 Sylvan Township
 Webster Township

Census-designated place
 Whitmore Lake (partial)

Other unincorporated communities

 Bridgewater
 Dixboro
 Delhi Mills
 Geddes
 Mooreville
 Paint Creek
 Salem
 Stony Creek
 Whittaker
 Willis

Ghost town
 Rawsonville (partial)

Education
School districts include:

 Ann Arbor Public Schools
 Columbia School District
 Chelsea School District
 Clinton Community Schools
 Dexter Community School District
 Grass Lake Community Schools
 Lincoln Consolidated School District
 Manchester Community Schools
 Milan Area Schools
 Northville Public Schools
 Pinckney Community Schools
 Plymouth-Canton Community Schools
 Saline Area Schools
 South Lyon Community Schools
 Stockbridge Community Schools
 Van Buren Public Schools
 Whitmore Lake Public Schools
 Ypsilanti Community Schools

Former school districts:
 Ypsilanti Public Schools
 Willow Run Community Schools

See also

 List of Michigan State Historic Sites in Washtenaw County, Michigan
 National Register of Historic Places listings in Washtenaw County, Michigan
 USS Washtenaw County (LST-1166)

References

Sources

External links

 Foodloose in Washtenaw: A Foodie's Guide to Washtenaw County, 2018
 Dexter District Library
 Washtenaw County Government
 Past and present of Washtenaw County, Michigan by Samuel W. Beakes Chicago: The S.J. Clarke publishing co., 1906
 Washtenaw Community Cafe An online discussion group for the county of Washtenaw
 Ypsilanti Historical Society

 
Michigan counties
Metro Detroit
1826 establishments in Michigan Territory
Populated places established in 1826